Women's 200m races for class T46 amputee athletes at the 2004 Summer Paralympics were held in the Athens Olympic Stadium on 25 and 27 September. The event consisted of 2 heats and a final, and was won by Amy Winters, representing .

1st round

Heat 1
25 Sept. 2004, 21:25

Heat 2
25 Sept. 2004, 21:31

Final round

27 Sept. 2004, 19:20

References

W
2004 in women's athletics